Pribylovo is an airbase of the Russian Air Force located near Pribylovo, Leningrad Oblast, Russia.

The base is home to the 549th Independent Helicopter Regiment.

References

Russian Air Force bases